Seniority is a Pune (India) based retail company. Founded by Ayush Agrawal , and Tapan Mishra, Seniority provides health and lifestyle products for senior citizens in India.

Investment and Revenue 
The company raised an early-stage investment of USD 1 million in 2017 from RPG Ventures, the venture capital arm of the RPG Group. The same group has invested  USD 6 million in Seniority till 2019. The company offers mobility aids, wellness products and lifestyle or leisure products  In 2017, the company reported a revenue of INR 1 crore per month. The company reported 500 percent growth in 2018.

Partnerships and stores 

 Seniority has partnered with Ezymov, a wheelchair taxi and ambulance service in Mumbai.
 Store partnership at ReLiva Physiotherapy and Rehab
 Store Partnership at Veteran CovaiCare, Coimbatore
 Store Partnership with Ashiana Housing
 DISC – Design Innovations for Senior Care in partnership with Indian School of Design and Innovation
 Offline Store in Pune
 Offline Store in Chennai
 Offline Store in Coimbatore
 Offline Store in Bhiwadi

Awards and recognition 

Limca Book of awards for the largest gathering of senior citizens doing yoga all at once at International Yoga Day
 Indian E-Retail Award for Specialty E-Retailer of the Year

References 

Companies based in Pune
Online retailers of India
Indian brands
Retail companies of India
Retail companies established in 2016
2016 establishments in Maharashtra
Indian companies established in 2016